Yanzar may refer to:
 Yanzar-e Olya
 Yanzar-e Sofla

See also
 Neyzar (disambiguation)